Junior Pauga (born 3 February 1996) is a professional rugby league footballer who plays for the North Sydney Bears as a  or er.

He previously played for the Wests Tigers in the NRL.

Background 
Born in Ōtāhuhu, Auckland, New Zealand, Pauga was a student at Kelston Boys' High School. In 2014, he was named MVP of the national secondary school tournament and chosen in the NZ Secondary Schools team to play New South Wales.

Career

2016-20
Between 2016 and 2018, Pauga was a member of the New Zealand Warriors NSW Cup team. From 2019, he joined the Wynnum Manly Seagulls in the Queensland Cup. In his first season, he played 13 games for 10 wins, 3 tries, 9 goals. and was a member of the team that lost to the Burleigh Bears in the grand final.

In 2020, Pauga made one appearance in Wynnum's first grade before the competition was cancelled because of the COVID-19 pandemic. One of a handful of players who chose to join the lower-grade team when that competition restarted, Pauga scored a try and kicked 6 goals as Wynnum won the reserve grade grand final. He said, "When COVID hit, we got told that Cup was off; and then I heard that BRL was coming back, so I was like... even though Cup was not on, I thought this would be a good opportunity for me to play footy and have fun with the boys. It was pretty good to be part of the team; I have some mates, we all came from New Zealand and the goal was for them to play Cup this year."

After playing the first 4 games with Wynnum in 2021, Pauga was released to join the Wests Tigers in the NRL.

2021 
Pauga made his debut in round 18, for the Wests Tigers against the Brisbane Broncos, scoring a try in a 42-24 victory. Before the game, he said, "It’s been a tough journey over the past three years. After leaving the Warriors, I didn’t have anything and had to go to Queensland to start all over again. When this opportunity came up, I had no doubt in my mind that I was going to take it with both hands and I don’t ever want to take it for granted."

2022 
In November 2022, Pauga signed for North Sydney ahead of the 2023 season.

References 

1996 births
New Zealand rugby league players
Rugby league centres
Wests Tigers players
Western Suburbs Magpies NSW Cup players
Living people
Rugby league players from Auckland